The 2019 ICO Crossminton World Championships was a crossminton tournament, taking place in Budapest, Hungary, between 4th and 7th July 2019. With the 1st Crossminton World Championships being played in 2011 and the competition taking place every two years, the 2019 World Championships was the 5th Crossminton World Championships. 505 players from 23 countries participated at the event.

Venue 
The tournament, organised by the Hungarian Crossminton Association, was played in Budapest’s multi-purpose indoor arena Tüskecsarnok.

Medal summary

Medalists

Junior Tournament Medalists

Senior Tournament Medalists

Participating nations

References

External links 
Mauritius article with interview
Slovenian results in the press media
German press
Hungarian news
Hungarian news
Hungarian news

2019 in Hungarian sport
International sports competitions in Budapest